This is a list of Philippine Basketball Association (PBA) conferences. Conferences are tournaments within a season, as opposed to the North American usage where a conference is a grouping of teams. If a team wins all of the conferences in a season, it is said that they have won a Grand Slam.

Types of conferences
As of the 2015–16 season, there is a total of 117 conferences/tournaments held by the PBA since 1975. It was further broken down into three categories:

 All Filipino conferences - only players with Filipino citizenship are allowed to compete. (38 tournaments as of 2015–16 season)
 Import-laden conferences - players with other citizenship/nationality are allowed to compete, with teams usually limited with one non-Filipino on their active lineup. (79 tournaments as of 2015–16 season)
 Special tournaments - teams may or may not include imports but championships won don't count to the championship tally.

Active tournaments
 All-Filipino Conference/All-Filipino Cup/Philippine Cup - TNT Tropang Giga
 Commissioner's Cup - San Miguel Beermen
 Governors' Cup - Barangay Ginebra San Miguel

Inactive tournaments
 All-Philippine Championship - Crispa Redmanizers (1976)
 Reinforced Filipino - Crispa Redmanizers (1983)
 Fiesta - Alaska Aces (2010)
 Open - San Miguel Beermen (1989)
 Reinforced - Coca-Cola Tigers (2003)
 First Conference - Shell Rimula X (1992)
 Third Conference - Swift Mighty Meaties (1992)
 Invitational - Alaska Aces (2003)

Special tournaments
 PBA-IBA- Añejo Rum 65ers (1988)
 Centennial - Mobiline Phone Pals (1998)

Number of conferences 
There had always been three conferences in a PBA season. The exceptions are:

 1981 PBA season had two conferences due to Manila's hosting of the 1981 Southeast Asian Games.
 1998 PBA season had four conferences due to the celebration of the centennial of the Philippine Declaration of Independence.
 There were two conferences from 2004 to 2010 due to modification of the season format from three conferences to two, and from changing the season calendar from January or February–December to October–July. To do this, there was a transitional 2004 PBA Fiesta Conference. The association reverted to three conferences for the 2010–11 PBA season.
 2020 PBA season had one conference due to the COVID-19 pandemic in the Philippines.
 2021 PBA season had two conferences due to the COVID-19 pandemic in the Philippines.

List of conferences

1970s
1975 PBA season
1975 PBA First Conference*
1975 PBA Second Conference*
1975 PBA All-Philippine Championship
1976 PBA season
1976 PBA First Conference*
1976 PBA Second Conference*
1976 PBA All-Philippine Championship
1977 PBA season
1977 PBA All-Filipino Conference
1977 PBA Open Conference
1977 PBA Invitational Championship
1978 PBA season
1978 PBA All-Filipino Conference
1978 PBA Open Conference
1978 PBA Invitational Championship
1979 PBA season
1979 PBA All-Filipino Conference
1979 PBA Open Conference
1979 PBA Invitational Championship

1980s
1980 PBA season
1980 PBA Open Conference
1980 PBA Invitational Championship
1980 PBA All-Filipino Conference
1981 PBA season
1981 PBA Open Conference
1981 PBA Reinforced Filipino Conference
1982 PBA season
1982 PBA Reinforced Filipino Conference
1982 PBA Invitational Championship
1982 PBA Open Conference
1983 PBA season
1983 PBA All-Filipino Conference
1983 PBA Reinforced Filipino Conference
1983 PBA Open Conference
1984 PBA season
1984 PBA First All-Filipino Conference
1984 PBA Second All-Filipino Conference
1984 PBA Invitational Championship
1985 PBA season
1985 PBA Open Conference
1985 PBA All-Filipino Conference
1985 PBA Reinforced Conference
1986 PBA season
1986 PBA Reinforced Conference
1986 PBA All-Filipino Conference
1986 PBA Open Conference
1987 PBA season
1987 PBA Open Conference
1987 PBA All-Filipino Conference
1987 PBA Reinforced Conference
1988 PBA season
1988 PBA Open Conference
1988 PBA All-Filipino Conference
1988 PBA Reinforced Conference
1989 PBA season
1989 PBA Open Conference
1989 PBA All-Filipino Conference
1989 PBA Reinforced Conference

1990s
1990 PBA season
1990 PBA First Conference
1990 PBA All-Filipino Conference
1990 PBA Third Conference
1991 PBA season
1991 PBA First Conference
1991 PBA All-Filipino Conference
1991 PBA Third Conference
1992 PBA season
1992 PBA First Conference
1992 PBA All-Filipino Conference
1992 PBA Third Conference
1993 PBA season
1993 PBA All-Filipino Cup
1993 PBA Commissioner's Cup
1993 PBA Governors' Cup
1994 PBA season
1994 PBA All-Filipino Cup
1994 PBA Commissioner's Cup
1994 PBA Governors' Cup
1995 PBA season
1995 PBA All-Filipino Cup
1995 PBA Commissioner's Cup
1995 PBA Governors' Cup
1996 PBA season
1996 PBA All-Filipino Cup
1996 PBA Commissioner's Cup
1996 PBA Governors' Cup
1997 PBA season
1997 PBA All-Filipino Cup
1997 PBA Commissioner's Cup
1997 PBA Governors' Cup
1998 PBA season
1998 PBA All-Filipino Cup
1998 PBA Commissioner's Cup
1998 PBA Centennial Cup
1998 PBA Governors' Cup
1999 PBA season
1999 PBA All-Filipino Cup
1999 PBA Commissioner's Cup
1999 PBA Governors' Cup

2000s
2000 PBA season
2000 PBA All-Filipino Cup
2000 PBA Commissioner's Cup
2000 PBA Governors' Cup
2001 PBA season
2001 PBA All-Filipino Cup
2001 PBA Commissioner's Cup
2001 PBA Governors' Cup
2002 PBA season
2002 PBA Governors' Cup
2002 PBA Commissioner's Cup
2002 PBA All-Filipino Cup
2003 PBA season
2003 PBA All-Filipino Cup
2003 PBA Invitational Cup
2003 PBA Reinforced Conference
2004 PBA Fiesta Conference
2004–05 PBA season
2004–05 PBA Philippine Cup
2005 PBA Fiesta Conference
2005–06 PBA season
2005–06 PBA Fiesta Conference
2006 PBA Philippine Cup
2006–07 PBA season
2006–07 PBA Philippine Cup
2007 PBA Fiesta Conference
2007–08 PBA season
2007–08 PBA Philippine Cup
2008 PBA Fiesta Conference
2008–09 PBA season
2008–09 PBA Philippine Cup
2009 PBA Fiesta Conference

2010s
2009–10 PBA season
2009–10 PBA Philippine Cup
2010 PBA Fiesta Conference
2010–11 PBA season
2010–11 PBA Philippine Cup
2011 PBA Commissioner's Cup
2011 PBA Governors' Cup
2011–12 PBA season
2011–12 PBA Philippine Cup
2012 PBA Commissioner's Cup
2012 PBA Governors' Cup
2012–13 PBA season
2012–13 PBA Philippine Cup
2013 PBA Commissioner's Cup
2013 PBA Governors' Cup
2013–14 PBA season
2013–14 PBA Philippine Cup
2014 PBA Commissioner's Cup
2014 PBA Governors' Cup
2014–15 PBA season
2014–15 PBA Philippine Cup
2015 PBA Commissioner's Cup
2015 PBA Governors' Cup
2015–16 PBA season
2015–16 PBA Philippine Cup
2016 PBA Commissioner's Cup
2016 PBA Governors' Cup
2016–17 PBA season
2016–17 PBA Philippine Cup
2017 PBA Commissioner's Cup
2017 PBA Governors' Cup
2017–18 PBA season
2017–18 PBA Philippine Cup
2018 PBA Commissioner's Cup
2018 PBA Governors' Cup
2019 PBA season
2019 PBA Philippine Cup
2019 PBA Commissioner's Cup
2019 PBA Governors' Cup

2020s 

 2020 PBA season
 2020 PBA Philippine Cup
 2021 PBA season
 2021 PBA Philippine Cup
 2021 PBA Governors' Cup
 2022–23 PBA season
 2022 PBA Philippine Cup
 2022–23 PBA Commissioner's Cup
 2023 PBA Governors' Cup

* The first and second conference of the 1975 and 1976 seasons were officially named as All-Filipino Conference and Open Conference respectively. The All-Filipino Conference was reclassified in the 2010s as an import-laced tournament since the league gave teams the option to hire foreign players or "imports". Both tournaments were renamed as First and Second Conference since the 2001 edition of Hardcourt, the official PBA Annual.

References
Past PBA seasons